"Bust a Move" is a song by British-American rapper Young MC from his 1989 debut album, Stone Cold Rhymin'. The song is built on a sample of "Found a Child" by the group Ballin' Jack. The drums, produced by a LinnDrum, are sampled from the song "Radio-Activity" by RoyalCash. The breakdown segment contains a combination of beats sampled from the songs "Scorpio" by Dennis Coffey and the Detroit Guitar Band, and "Daytime Hustler" by Bette Midler. "Bust a Move" also featured guest vocals by Crystal Blake and bass guitar by Red Hot Chili Peppers bassist Flea, who both appear in the music video.

Released as a single on May 22, 1989, "Bust a Move" is Young MC's biggest hit, reaching number seven on the US Billboard Hot 100 and topping the charts in Australia in 1990. The song stayed on the Billboard Hot 100 for 39 weeks and 20 weeks in the top 40, winning the 1990 Grammy Award for Best Rap Performance. In 2008, the song was ranked number 47 on VH1's "100 Greatest Songs of Hip Hop". The single was certified platinum in the United States by the Recording Industry Association of America (RIAA) in January 1990.

Charts

Weekly charts

Year-end charts

Certifications

Release history

In popular culture
The song is featured in the films Uncle Buck (1989), Dude, Where's My Car? (2000), See Spot Run (2001), Grind (2003), The Blind Side and 17 Again (2009), The Perks of Being a Wallflower (2012) and It (2017). Romeo sampled the song's music and hook for his song "Big Moves" on the soundtrack of the 2001 film Max Keeble's Big Move. It also appears in the 2009 film Up in the Air, in which Young MC has a cameo performing the song.

The song was performed by Will Schuester in the Glee episode "Mash-Up" and is regularly used in the television show My Name Is Earl as Randy's favorite party song. It was also featured as a playable song in the rhythm game Dance Central. The song appears on the soundtrack of the 2016 video game Forza Horizon 3, and is played in the Futurama episode "Bender Should Not Be Allowed on TV". It also makes an appearance in The Big Bang Theory season 9 episode "The Positive Negative Reaction", where Leonard and Raj sing the song at a bar during karaoke.

References

External links
 Entry at Discogs.com
 [ Review at Allmusic.com]

1989 singles
1989 songs
Number-one singles in Australia
Songs written by Young MC
Grammy Award for Best Rap Performance
Music videos directed by Tamra Davis
4th & B'way Records singles
Delicious Vinyl singles
Island Records singles
Ariola Records singles
Songs about dancing